The Journey Begins or variation may refer to:

 Journey Begins (2010 album) debut album of British singer Mumzy Stranger
 The Journey Begins (2005 song) song from the Disney film Mulan II
 The Journey Begins (TV episode), the 1999 first episode of the TV series Sir Arthur Conan Doyle's The Lost World
 Mortal Kombat: The Journey Begins (1995 film) animated tie-in film to the 1995 film Mortal Kombat (1)
 The Dark Tower: The Journey Begins (2010 comic) comic book mini-series based on Stephen King's The Dark Tower
 The Journey Begins (2015 comic book) first volume of the comic book series Anne Bonnie (comics)
 The Journey Begins (2010 comics) the first story arc in the comic book The Wormworld Saga

See also
 A journey of a thousand miles begins with a single step (Chinese proverb)
 End of a Journey, Yet Beginning of a Journey (TV episode) 2006 episode of Pokémon: Battle Frontier
 The Journey: Act I; The Beginning (2012 album) debut EP for the band The Birdsongs (band)
 The Beginning of the Journey (1993 book) a memoir of Diana Trilling
 Journey (disambiguation)
 Begin (disambiguation)